Gluudneset is a headland in Oscar II Land at Spitsbergen, Svalbard. It is located south of Ny-Ålesund at the southwestern side of Kongsfjorden, and marks the southern extension of the bay Zeppelinhamna.

References

Headlands of Spitsbergen